Cliff Lodge is a historic house located in Hood River, Oregon, United States.

The house was listed on the National Register of Historic Places in 2000.

See also

National Register of Historic Places listings in Hood River County, Oregon

References

External links

Buildings and structures in Hood River, Oregon
National Register of Historic Places in Hood River County, Oregon
1928 establishments in Oregon
Buildings and structures completed in 1928
Arts and Crafts architecture in Oregon